Omrane Sadok (15 October 1937 – 16 August 2021) was a Tunisian boxer. He competed in the boxing events at the 1960 Summer Olympics.

At the 1959 Mediterranean Games, Omrane won a gold medal in the welterweight –67 kg event.

References

1937 births
2021 deaths
Olympic boxers of Tunisia
Boxers at the 1960 Summer Olympics
Mediterranean Games gold medalists for Tunisia
Competitors at the 1959 Mediterranean Games
Sportspeople from Tunis
Tunisian male boxers
Mediterranean Games medalists in boxing
Welterweight boxers
20th-century Tunisian people
21st-century Tunisian people